Herbert Sydney Wood (8 August 1920 – 16 August 2001) was an Australian rules footballer who played with North Melbourne in the Victorian Football League (VFL).

Notes

External links 

1920 births
2001 deaths
Australian rules footballers from Victoria (Australia)
North Melbourne Football Club players